The Morris-Martel was a British inter-war tankette developed from prototypes designed by Lieutenant-General Sir Giffard Le Quesne Martel. Intended for reconnaissance, eight were constructed for the Experimental Mechanized Force and were tested on Salisbury plain in 1927, against experimental models of the Carden Loyd tankette built by John Carden and Vivian Loyd as a response to Martel's work. The project was abandoned after testing with the Carden Loyd design chosen instead; during its short existence the tankette attracted "quite a lot of publicity" and was a pioneer of the tankette concept.

References
Notes

Sources
 
 

Tankettes of the interwar period
Interwar tanks of the United Kingdom
Military vehicles introduced in the 1920s
History of the tank